Aznashevo (Aźnaş) is a rural locality (a village) in Tungatarovsky Selsoviet, Uchalinsky District, Bashkortostan, Russia. The population was 11 as of 2010. There is 1 street.

Geography 
Aznashevo is located 59 km northeast of Uchaly (the district's administrative centre) by road. Kazhayevo is the nearest rural locality.

References 

Rural localities in Uchalinsky District